Farm to Market Roads in Texas are owned and maintained by the Texas Department of Transportation (TxDOT).

FM 2700

Farm to Market Road 2700 (FM 2700) is located in Callahan County.

FM 2701

Farm to Market Road 2701 (FM 2701) is located in Knox and Haskell counties.

FM 2702

Farm to Market Road 2702 (FM 2702) is located in Jones County.

FM 2703

Farm to Market Road 2703 (FM 2703) is located in Jones County.

FM 2704

Farm to Market Road 2704 (FM 2704) was located in Bosque County. No highway currently uses the FM 2704 designation.

FM 2704 was designated on September 20, 1961, running from FM 56 north of Valley Mills eastward  to a county road. The highway was extended further east  on May 2, 1962. FM 2704 was cancelled on July 2, 1965, with the mileage being transferred to FM 1637.

FM 2705

Farm to Market Road 2705 (FM 2705) is located in Limestone County.

FM 2706

Farm to Market Road 2706 (FM 2706) is located in Anderson County.

FM 2707

Farm to Market Road 2707 (FM 2707) is located in Coleman and Callahan counties.

FM 2707 (1961)

FM 2707 was first designated on September 20, 1961, running from FM 2005 east of Pecan Wells southeast  to a county road. The highway was cancelled on October 9, 1961, with the mileage being transferred to FM 1047.

FM 2708

Farm to Market Road 2708 (FM 2708) is located in Cherokee County.

FM 2708 was designated on September 20, 1961.

FM 2709

Farm to Market Road 2709 (FM 2709) is located in Henderson County.

FM 2710

Farm to Market Road 2710 (FM 2710) is located in Smith County.

FM 2711

Farm to Market Road 2711 (FM 2711) is located in Ochiltree County.

FM 2712

Farm to Market Road 2712 (FM 2712) is located in Houston County.

FM 2713

Farm to Market Road 2713 (FM 2713) is located in Nacogdoches County.

FM 2714

Farm to Market Road 2714 (FM 2714) is located in Fayette County.

FM 2714 (1961)

FM 2714 was first designated on September 20, 1961, running from US 59 north of Corrigan northward  to a road intersection. The highway was cancelled on May 23, 1966, with the mileage being transferred to FM 357.

FM 2715
Farm to Market Road 2715 (FM 2715) is a highway that was designated twice. No highway currently uses the FM 2715 designation.

FM 2715 (1961)

The first FM 2715 was designated on September 20, 1961, from FM 762 east to the Brazos River. It became part of FM 1462 when it was extended west across the river.

FM 2715 (1962)

The highway was extended  to a road intersection on May 6, 1964. The highway was extended south to SH 79 on June 2, 1967. FM 2715 was cancelled on June 21, 1967, with the mileage being transferred to FM 2393.

FM 2716

Farm to Market Road 2716 (FM 2716) is located in Delta County.

FM 2716 (1961)

The first FM 2716 was designated on September 20, 1961. It became part of either FM 1092 or FM 1736 when both roads were extended.

FM 2717

Farm to Market Road 2717 (FM 2717) is located in Calhoun County.

FM 2718

Farm to Market Road 2718 (FM 2718) is located in DeWitt County.

FM 2719

Farm to Market Road 2719 (FM 2719) is located in Hill County.

FM 2719 (1961)

The highway's northern terminus was relocated to SH 95 on May 24, 1962. FM 2719 was cancelled later that day, with the mileage being transferred to FM 966.

FM 2720

Farm to Market Road 2720 (FM 2720) is located in Hays and Caldwell counties.

RM 2721

Ranch to Market Road 2721 (RM 2721) is located in Gillespie and Blanco counties.

RM 2722

Ranch to Market Road 2722 (RM 2722) is located in Comal County.

FM 2723

Farm to Market Road 2723 (FM 2723) is located in Franklin County.

FM 2723 (1961)

The original FM 2723 was designated on September 20, 1961, to run from FM 78 in McQueeney to US 90. This route was cancelled on December 11, 1961, and became a portion of FM 725.

FM 2724

Farm to Market Road 2724 (FM 2724) is located in Karnes County.

FM 2725

Farm to Market Road 2725 (FM 2725) is located in San Patricio County.

FM 2726

Farm to Market Road 2726 (FM 2726) is located in Washington County.

FM 2727

Farm to Market Road 2727 (FM 2727) is located in Kaufman County.

FM 2727 begins at an intersection with SH 243 east of Kaufman. The highway travels in a northeast direction, running between the two city lakes and Kaufman Lake. FM 2727 turns in a more eastward direction at County Road 140 before briefly turning towards the south and turning back northeast at County Road 103. The highway continues to run in a northeast direction before ending at an intersection with FM 429 southwest of College Mound.

The highway was extended to FM 429 on June 25, 1962, bringing FM 2727 to its current route.

FM 2728

Farm to Market Road 2728 (FM 2728) is located in Kaufman County.

FM 2728 begins at an intersection with SH 34 between Kaufman and Oak Ridge. The highway runs northeast through Oak Ridge then runs through more rural areas of the county. FM 2728 runs near Trinity Valley Community College and has an overlap with FM 429. The two highways separate just north of I-20, with FM 2728 running northeast to Elmo. In Elmo, the highway shares an overlap with US 80. FM 2728 continues to run in a northeast direction before turning northeast near County Road 342. The highway continues to run northwest until ending at an intersection with FM 429 near Ables Springs.

FM 2728 was designated on September 20, 1961, running from US 80 in Elmo southwestward to FM 429. The highway was extended  from FM 429 to SH 34 near Kaufman on May 6, 1964. On May 5, 1966, FM 2728 was extended northeast  from US 80 in Elmo to road intersection. The highway was extended further north  to FM 429, bringing FM 2728 to its current routing.

Junction list

FM 2729

Farm to Market Road 2729 (FM 2729) is located in Grayson County.

FM 2730

Farm to Market Road 2730 (FM 2730) is located in Uvalde County.

FM 2731

Farm to Market Road 2731 (FM 2731) is located in Eastland County.

FM 2732

Farm to Market Road 2732 (FM 2732) is located in San Saba County.

FM 2733

Farm to Market Road 2733 (FM 2733) is located in Briscoe County.

FM 2734

Farm to Market Road 2734 (FM 2734) is located in Collingsworth County.

FM 2735

Farm to Market Road 2735 (FM 2735) is located in Bowie County.

FM 2736

Farm to Market Road 2736 (FM 2736) is located in Hunt County.

FM 2737

Farm to Market Road 2737 (FM 2737) is located in Hunt and Rains counties.

FM 2738

Farm to Market Road 2738 (FM 2738) is located in Johnson County.

FM 2739

Farm to Market Road 2739 (FM 2739) is located in Cooke County.

FM 2740

Farm to Market Road 2740 (FM 2740) was located in Young County. No highway currently uses the FM 2740 designation.

FM 2740 was designated on May 2, 1962, running from SH 254 at Henry Chapel, northeastward to the Jack county line. The highway was cancelled on May 22, 1964, with the mileage being transferred to FM 1191.

FM 2741

Farm to Market Road 2741 (FM 2741) is located in Lipscomb County.

FM 2742

Farm to Market Road 2742 (FM 2742) is located in Coke County.

FM 2743

Farm to Market Road 2743 (FM 2743) is located in Angelina County.

FM 2743 begins at an intersection with SH 63 east of Zavalla. The highway travels east through the Angelina National Forest and intersects FM 3373 before ending at the entrance to Caney Creek Park at Forest Service Road 336.

FM 2743 was designated on October 28, 1966, on its current route.

Junction list

FM 2743 (1962)

The highway was cancelled on May 16, 1966, with the mileage being transferred to RM 2134 (now FM 2134).

FM 2744

Farm to Market Road 2744 (FM 2744) is located in Fisher County.

FM 2745

Farm to Market Road 2745 (FM 2745) is located in Falls County.

FM 2745 (1962)

The highway was cancelled on May 1, 1965; the southern  was transferred to FM 1538 and the remainder was removed from the Farm to Market Road system.

FM 2746

Farm to Market Road 2746 (FM 2746) is located in Jones County.

FM 2747

Farm to Market Road 2747 (FM 2747) is located in Shelby County.

FM 2747 (1962)

The highway was cancelled on June 10, 1965, with the mileage being transferred to FM 1081.

RM 2748

Ranch to Market Road 2748 (RM 2748) is located in Real and Uvalde counties.

FM 2748 (1962)

The highway was extended  to the Salt Fork Brazos River on June 28, 1963. FM 2748 was cancelled on May 22, 1964, with the mileage being transferred to FM 1263.

FM 2748 (1965)

FM 2748 was designated a second time on June 1, 1965, running from SH 317 in Belton to FM 439. The highway was cancelled on January 31, 1974, with the mileage being transferred to FM 93.

FM 2749

Farm to Market Road 2749 (FM 2749) is located in Limestone County.

FM 2750

Farm to Market Road 2750 (FM 2750) is located in Cherokee County. It runs  from an intersection with FM 2064 northwest of New Summerfield, east to an intersection with SH 110.

FM 2750 was designated on May 2, 1962, along the current route.

FM 2751

Farm to Market Road 2751 (FM 2751) is located in Gregg County, running from FM 1844 near Judson north to Brown Rd.

FM 2751 was designated in 1962 from proposed SH 26 (now US 259) north 3.6 miles. In 1977, FM 2751 was extended north to US 259, its current northern terminus.

Junction list

FM 2752

Farm to Market Road 2752 (FM 2752) is located in Henderson County.

FM 2753

Farm to Market Road 2753 (FM 2753) is located in Rusk County.

FM 2754

Farm to Market Road 2754 (FM 2754) is located in Austin County.

FM 2755

Farm to Market Road 2755 (FM 2755) is located in Collin County.

FM 2756

Farm to Market Road 2756 (FM 2756) is located in Collin County.

FM 2757

Farm to Market Road 2757 (FM 2757) is located in Kaufman County.

FM 2757 begins at an intersection with FM 740 in Mesquite just south of I-20. The highway runs in a southeast direction through rural areas of the county, running just south of Soil Conservation Service Site Reservoir 11 before ending at an intersection with FM 741 southeast of the Heartland subdivision.

FM 2757 was designated on June 25, 1962, along the current route.

RM 2758

Ranch to Market Road 2758 (RM 2758) is located in Hemphill County.

FM 2758

On July 30, 1963, FM 2758 was cancelled and transferred to FM 1489.

FM 2759

Farm to Market Road 2759 (FM 2759) is located in Fort Bend County. The highway begins at Interstate 69 (I-69)/U.S. Highway 59 (US 59), heads southwest to Farm to Market Road 762, turns southeast and ends in Thompsons.

In this stretch, FM 2759 is also known as Crabb River Road. The highway is a continuation of SH 99 which heads northeast from I-69/US 59. Nearby communities include Greatwood, Tara and Canyongate at the Brazos. Businesses along Crabb River Road include a car dealership, a few petrol stations, and a number of stores and restaurants. There are traffic signals at Sansbury Boulevard and Tara Drive and bridges over Middle Bayou and Rabbs Bayou. FM 2759 turns sharply to the east-southeast at the traffic light controlled intersection with FM 762.

From this place to its terminus, FM 2759 runs parallel to the BNSF Railway tracks. For  until it reaches Macek Road, the highway passes along the south side of the Tara subdivision. After this point the landscape becomes rural. At Booth, the highway bends more to the southeast. The Riverpointe Golf Club is southeast of Booth on the north side. Just before Pittman Road, FM 2759 passes under electric transmission lines before curving slightly more to the southeast. As the highway approaches Thompsons, there is an oil well, tanks and a flare on the north side. Near Y. U. Jones Road, the highway bends so that it goes nearly east. After an additional  FM 2759 intersects with Thompsons Oil Field Road, which goes south across the railroad tracks. The road continues east for another  but only connects with minor roads beyond that point.

On September 5, 1973, the highway was extended an additional  to the northeast from FM 762 to what is now I-69/US 59 and SH 99 intersection.

Junction list

FM 2760

Farm to Market Road 2760 (FM 2760) is located in Calhoun County.

FM 2761

Farm to Market Road 2761 (FM 2761) is located in Colorado County.

FM 2762

Farm to Market Road 2762 (FM 2762) is located in Fayette County.

FM 2763

Farm to Market Road 2763 (FM 2763) is located in Scurry County.

FM 2763 (1962)

The original FM 2763 was designated on May 2, 1962, from US 77, 1 mile south of Hallettsville, southwest  to Mont. On November 26, 1969, the road was extended southwest  from Mont. On May 5, 1970, the road was extended southwest to FM 531. FM 2763 was cancelled on May 18, 1970, and became a portion of FM 318.

FM 2764

Farm to Market Road 2764 (FM 2764) is located in Wharton and Colorado counties. The two-lane highway begins at U.S. Route 90 Alternate (US 90A) northwest of Lissie, heads northeast along the boundary line between Colorado and Wharton Counties and ends at FM 1093 in Chesterville.

From this point, the highway crosses the Union Pacific Railroad and heads northeast along the Colorado-Wharton county line. In fact, the gravel road that goes southwest from the starting point is called County Line Road. FM 2764 runs  through croplands until it crosses a disused railroad and ends at FM 1093. A short distance before its end, FM 2764 curves to the north into Colorado County and meets FM 1093 at a stop sign in the small community of Chesterville.

The initial authorization is still in force.

FM 2765

Farm to Market Road 2765 (FM 2765) is located in Wharton County.

RM 2766

Ranch to Market Road 2766 (RM 2766) is located in Blanco County.

FM 2767

Farm to Market Road 2767 (FM 2767), also known as Old Kilgore Highway, runs from Loop 323 in Tyler east to SH 31 near Kilgore.

The current route of FM 2767 was designated on December 20, 1963. On September 29, 2005, FM 2767 was rerouted to end at Loop 323 further north; the old route from FM 850 to the new route was obliterated, the old route from FM 850 to near Loop 323 was given to the county, and a small portion near Loop 323 was obliterated.

Junction list

RM 2767

FM 2767 was previously designated as RM 2767 on May 2, 1962, on a route from US 87 north of Fredericksburg north .  The route was redesignated on July 10, 1963, as RM 2323 when it was extended farther north to meet the existing RM 2323.

RM 2768

Ranch to Market Road 2768 (RM 2768) is located in Llano County.

RM 2769

Ranch to Market Road 2769 (RM 2769) is a  route in Travis County. A portion of RM 2769 carries the name Anderson Mill Road.

RM 2769 begins in Volente at an intersection with Lime Creek Road. It proceeds northeast to an intersection with Anderson Mill Road, along which it continues for  before terminating at RM 620 near the Travis–Williamson county line.

RM 2769 was designated on May 2, 1962, with its current description.

RM 2769 originally ran continuously from Volente to its intersection with RM 620. In 2007, Anderson Mill Road was extended along the most easterly mile of this right-of-way. RM 2769 now approaches from the southwest and continues onto Anderson Mill Road using a T-intersection.

FM 2770

Farm to Market Road 2770 (FM 2770) is located in Hays County.

FM 2770 (1962)

On June 2, 1967, the road was extended to the Gonzales County line. FM 2770 was cancelled on June 15, 1967, and became a portion of FM 1117.

FM 2771

Farm to Market Road 2771 (FM 2771) is located in Kerr County. The highway is known locally as Lower Turtle Creek Road.

FM 2771 begins at an intersection with SH 16 southwest of Kerrville. The highway runs parallel to Turtle Creek and crosses the creek twice before turning north and ending at an intersection with SH 173 southeast of Kerrville. FM 2771 is a two-lane road with a speed limit of 55 MPH for its entire length.

FM 2771 was designated on May 2, 1962, along the current route.

FM 2772

Farm to Market Road 2772 (FM 2772) is located in Wilson County.

FM 2773

Farm to Market Road 2773 (FM 2773) is located in Karnes County.

FM 2774

Farm to Market Road 2774 (FM 2774) is located in Burleson County.

RM 2775

Ranch to Market Road 2775 (RM 2775) is located in El Paso County. The highway is known locally as Hueco Tanks Road.

RM 2235 begins in western Butterfield northeast of El Paso at Montana Avenue which carries US 62 and US 180 in northeastern El Paso County. The  route encounters gentle grades running through a valley in the western Hueco Mountains east of Fort Bliss, past the Hueco Tanks rock formation to Hueco Tanks State Historic Site, a state park maintained by the Texas Parks and Wildlife Department. The road becomes PR 68 upon entering the park. Along its length, the road intersects only local streets and private roads.

RM 2775 was designated on June 2, 1967, along the current route. On February 21, 1974, the continuation of the road within the state park, previously without designation, was named Park Road 68.

FM 2775 (1962)

The highway was cancelled on May 18, 1966, with the mileage being transferred to FM 772.

FM 2776

Farm to Market Road 2776 (FM 2776) is located in Brazos County.

FM 2776 was designated in 1962 along its current route.

FM 2777

Farm to Market Road 2777 (FM 2777) is located in Freestone County.

FM 2778

Farm to Market Road 2778 (FM 2778) was located in Walker County. No highway currently uses the FM 2778 designation.

FM 2778 was cancelled on December 21, 1990, and became a portion of FM 2693. FM 2778 was not cancelled until the road connecting FM 2693's previous end  to FM 2778 was complete.

FM 2779

Farm to Market Road 2779 (FM 2779) is located in Frio County.

FM 2780

Farm to Market Road 2780 (FM 2780) is located in Washington County.

FM 2781

Farm to Market Road 2781 (FM 2781) is located in Houston and Trinity counties.

FM 2782

Farm to Market Road 2782 (FM 2782) is located in Nacogdoches County.

FM 2783

Farm to Market Road 2783 (FM 2783) is located in Nacogdoches County.

FM 2784

Farm to Market Road 2784 (FM 2784) is located in Sabine County.

FM 2785

Farm to Market Road 2785 (FM 2785) is located in San Augustine County.

FM 2786

Farm to Market Road 2786 (FM 2786) is located in Collin County. The highway is locally known as Stacy Road.

FM 2786 begins at junction with SH 5 in Allen. FM 2786 enters into Fairview and ends at an intersection with FM 1378.

The current FM 2786 was designated on May 25, 1976, running from US 75 eastward to FM 1378. On June 27, 1995, the entire route was redesignated Urban Road 2786 (UR 2786). On July 26, 2007, the section from US 75 to SH 5 was cancelled and removed from the state highway system. The designation of the remaining section reverted to FM 2786 with the elimination of the Urban Road system on November 15, 2018.

FM 2786 (1962)

The highway was decommissioned on June 20, 1967, with the mileage being transferred to FM 1992.

FM 2786 (1967)

The highway's western terminus was moved  on October 1, 1968. FM 2786 was cancelled on December 29, 1975, with the mileage being transferred to FM 2484.

FM 2787

Farm to Market Road 2787 (FM 2787) is located in Shelby County.

FM 2788

Farm to Market Road 2788 (FM 2788) is located in Shelby County.

FM 2789

Farm to Market Road 2789 (FM 2789) is located in Bowie County.

FM 2790

Farm to Market Road 2790 (FM 2790) runs from FM 471 in LaCoste to I-410 in southwestern San Antonio.

FM 2790 begins at an intersection with FM 471 in LaCoste and runs along the southern half of Castro Avenue through the town. The highway runs in a southern direction before entering the town of Lytle and has an overlap with SH 132. FM 2790 meets I-35 before leaving the town and turns to the east. The highway enters Somerset and runs along Dixon Street before turning northeast onto Somerset Road. FM 2790 intersects with Loop 1604 before leaving the town. The highway enters the city limits of San Antonio and crosses over the Medina River. FM 2790 continues to run in a northeast direction through the southwestern part of the city before ending at I-410/SH 16/SH 130.

The current FM 2790 was designated on August 23, 1973, running from FM 471 in LaCoste to a point at US 81 (now SH 132) in Lytle, then from another point at US 81 to FM 1604 (now Loop 1604) in Somerset as a renumbering of a portion of FM 1518. On June 21, 1977, the eastern terminus of the highway was moved when FM 1604 was re-rerouted through Somerset. The highway was extended further northeastward to the Medina River on May 27, 1987. The last change came on November 11, 1987, when FM 2790 was extended to I-410 in San Antonio.

Junction list

FM 2790 (1962)

FM 2790 was first designated on May 2, 1962, running from SH 26 (now US 259) west of DeKalb westward  to a county road. This highway was cancelled on May 18, 1970, with the mileage being transferred to FM 1701.

FM 2791

Farm to Market Road 2791 (FM 2791) is located in Cass County.

FM 2792

Farm to Market Road 2792 (FM 2792) is located in Panola County. It runs from US 59 northeast to FM 1794.

FM 2792 was designated on November 24, 1970, on its current route.

FM 2792 (1962)

The original FM 2792 was designated on May 2, 1962, from FM 31 in DeBerry west and south  to FM 1186. FM 2792 was cancelled on November 24, 1970, and became a portion of FM 1794; FM 2792 was reassigned to the old route of US 59.

FM 2793

Farm to Market Road 2793 (FM 2793) is located in Walker County.

FM 2793 (1962)

FM 2793 was first designated on May 2, 1962, from SH 154 southward through Kelsey to FM 554. This was cancelled on August 3, 1971, and mileage was transferred to FM 1795.

FM 2794

Farm to Market Road 2794 (FM 2794) is located in Crosby and Dickens counties.

FM 2795

Farm to Market Road 2795 (FM 2795) is located in Rains County.

FM 2796

Farm to Market Road 2796 (FM 2796) is located in Upshur County.

FM 2797

Farm to Market Road 2797 (FM 2797) is located in Liberty County.

FM 2798

Farm to Market Road 2798 (FM 2798) is located in Hardin and Polk counties.

FM 2799

Farm to Market Road 2799 (FM 2799) is located in Jasper County.

Notes

References

+27
Farm to market roads 2700
Farm to Market Roads 2700